James Smith Bush (June 15, 1825 – November 11, 1889) was an American attorney, Episcopal priest, religious writer, and an ancestor of the Bush political family. He was the father of business magnate Samuel Prescott Bush, grandfather of former U.S. Senator Prescott Bush, great-grandfather of former U.S. President George H. W. Bush and great-great-grandfather of former Texas Governor and President George W. Bush and former Florida Governor Jeb Bush.

Biography
James Smith Bush was born in Rochester, New York, to Obadiah Newcomb Bush and Harriet Smith (1800–1867).  In 1851, his father returned from the California Gold Rush after two years in order to reclaim his family and bring them west.  He died aboard a ship on his return voyage and was presumably buried at sea.

Yale College
Bush entered Yale College in 1841 (class of 1844), the first of what would become a long family tradition, as his grandsons Prescott Sheldon Bush and  James Bush, great-grandsons George H. W. Bush, Prescott Sheldon Bush, Jr., Jonathan Bush and William H. T. Bush, great great-grandson George W. Bush, and great-great-great-granddaughter Barbara are all Yale alumni. He is accounted among the over 300 Yale alumni and faculty who supported in 1883 the founding of Wolf's Head Society. After Yale, he returned to Rochester and studied law, joining the bar in 1847.

First marriage
His first wife, Sarah Freeman, lived in Saratoga Springs. They married in 1851, but she died 18 months later during childbirth.

This prompted Bush to study divinity with the rector of the Episcopal church there. Ordained a deacon in 1855, he was appointed rector at the newly organized Grace Church in Orange, New Jersey.

Second marriage
On February 24, 1859, he married Harriet Eleanor [Fay], daughter of Samuel Howard and Susan [Shellman] Fay, at Trinity Church, New York City. Fay was born in Savannah, Georgia. Her father is the sixth generation removed to John Fay, immigrant patriarch, born in England abt. 1648, embarking on May 30, 1656, at Gravesend on the ship Speedwell, and arrived in Boston June 27, 1656.

Children
 James Freeman, b. June 15, 1860, Essex Co., NJ
 Samuel Prescott, b. October 4, 1863, Orange., NJ
 Harold Montfort, b. November 14, 1871, Dansville, NY
 Eleanor Howard, b. November 7, 1873, Staten Island, NY

Samuel was named after Harriet Fay's grandfather, Samuel Prescott Phillips Fay.

Career
In 1865–66, having been given a health sabbatical by his church, he traveled to San Francisco via the Straits of Magellan on the ironclad monitor  with Commodore John Rodgers (a parishioner of his), with international goodwill stops along the way. Officially, he was designated Commodore's Secretary, but was considered "acting chaplain", giving services on board and even conducting a shipboard wedding for a German American they encountered in Montevideo, an incident Bush recounted in dispatches he wrote for The Overland Monthly. Coincidentally, the fleet observed the punitive shelling of a defenseless Valparaíso, Chile by the Spanish Navy during the Chincha Islands War, after mediation efforts by Rodgers failed.

In 1867–1872, Bush was called to Grace Church (later Cathedral) in San Francisco, but troubled by family obligations, only stayed five years. His short stay along with that of photographic roll film inventor Hannibal Goodwin was to be satirized by Mark Twain in his weekly column in The Californian.

In 1872, Bush took a call from Church of the Ascension at West Brighton, Staten Island. In 1884, during a dispute over a church raffle (a gold watch was auctioned, which he considered gambling), he stepped down.

In 1883, Bush published a collection of sermons called More Words About the Bible, a response to his colleague Heber Newton's book Right and Wrong Uses of the Bible. In 1885, his book Evidence of Faith was reviewed by The Literary World as "clear, simple, and unpretending", and summarized as an argument against supernatural explanations for God. According to the same journal, both works fit into the broad church movement. The Boston Advertiser called the latter work "the best statement of untrammeled spiritual thought" among recent books.

Bush retired to Concord, Massachusetts, and in 1888 left the Episcopal Church altogether and became a Unitarian. The stress of this separation caused him health problems for the remainder of his life. He moved to Ithaca, New York where he died suddenly while raking leaves in 1889.

Published works

Sermons

Books

References

External links

 http://mssa.library.yale.edu/obituary_record/1859_1924/1889-90.pdf
 https://web.archive.org/web/20021006163356/http://www.gracecathedral.org/enrichment/crypt/cry_20010221.shtml
 

1825 births
1889 deaths
American Episcopal priests
American Unitarians
Bush family
Converts to Unitarianism
Lawyers from San Francisco
Yale College alumni
People from Orange, New Jersey
People from Staten Island
Religious leaders from Rochester, New York
19th-century American politicians
Lawyers from Rochester, New York
Writers from Rochester, New York
Burials at Sleepy Hollow Cemetery